Mocis conveniens, the pale brown lines, is a moth of the family Erebidae.

It has a wide range in Africa south of the Sahara, from Ethiopia to Sierra Leone and from Sudan to South Africa. Its presence has also been stated in Yemen.

References

Moths described in 1858
Moths of Madagascar
Moths of Sub-Saharan Africa
Lepidoptera of the Democratic Republic of the Congo
Moths of the Comoros
Moths of Mauritius
Moths of Seychelles
Moths of Réunion
conveniens